Wilawan Choptang (born 18 April 1984) is a former professional tennis player from Thailand.

She has career-high WTA rankings of 518 in singles, achieved on 24 October 2005, and 321 in doubles, set on 3 April 2006. Choptang won three doubles titles on the ITF Women's Circuit.

Her only WTA Tour main-draw appearance came at the 2002 Pattaya Open, where she partnered with Suchanun Viratprasert in the doubles event.

Playing for Thailand Fed Cup team, Choptang has a win–loss record of 1–2.

ITF Circuit finals

Singles (0–1)

Doubles (3–4)

References

External links
 
 
 

1984 births
Living people
Wilawan Choptang
Competitors at the 2003 Southeast Asian Games
Wilawan Choptang
Wilawan Choptang
Wilawan Choptang
Southeast Asian Games medalists in tennis
Wilawan Choptang